Springfield is a suburb in the City of Ipswich, Queensland, Australia.

Springfield is in proximity of the nearby suburbs Springfield Lakes and Springfield Central.

History
Springfield was built as part of Greater Springfield, which was Australia's largest master-planned community at the time of its construction. In 2007, a larger master-planned community at nearby Ripley was announced.

Springfield State School opened on 22 January 1998. On 1 January 2000, it was renamed Woodcrest State College.

The Springfield College opened on 1 July 1998.

Staines Memorial College opened 25 January 2005 in Springfield. It is named in the memory of Graham Staines, a missionary in India who was burned to death by fundamentalist Hindus in 1999. In 2010, the college relocated to Redbank Plains.

Hymba Yumba Independent School opened in 2011. It was established by Uncle Albert Holt and is based on Indigenous culture. The name comes from the Bidjara language with Hymba referring to the skills such as listening and reflecting while Yumba refers to building and refers to both the creation of the physical premises and the creation of a community around the school. When it first opened, there were 50 students enrolled with 8 staff.

The school opened its doors with only 50 students and 8 staff members, and today has over 280 students and 40 staff making up the school community.

Education 
Woodcrest State College is a government primary and secondary (Early Childhood-12) school for boys and girls at 38 Nev Smith Drive. In 2018, the school had an enrolment of 1,694 students with 140 teachers (131 full-time equivalent) and 78 non-teaching staff (56 full-time equivalent). It includes a special education program.

Springfield Anglican College is a private primary and secondary (Prep-12) school for boys and girls which opened on 1 July 1998. Its primary (Prep-6) campus is at Springfield College Drive and its secondary (7-12) campus is at 68 Springfield Greenbank Arterial.  In 2018, the school had an enrolment of 952 students with 74 teachers (65 full-time equivalent) and 69 non-teaching staff (43 full-time equivalent).

Hymba Yumba Independent School is a private primary and secondary (Prep-12) school at 6 Springfield Parkway. The school has a focus on teaching the national curriculum using Indigenous Knowledge. In 2018, the school had an enrolment of 154 students with 19 teachers (all full-time) and 19 non-teaching staff (all full-time).

Amenities 
The Camira Springfield Community Centre is at 389 Old Logan Road.

Springfield Fair is a shopping centre at 16 Springfield Parkway.

There are a number of parks in the suburb, including:

 Bob Gibbs Park
 Bridgewater Park

 Brommiley Park

 Carnation Close Reserve

 Clancy's Reserve

 College Park

 Curlew Park

 Emerald Park

 Escarpment Village Park

 Foxglove Court Reserve

 H L Jones Park

 Kuring-gai Park

 Lilac Park

 Lloyd Bird Park

 Lookout Park

 M Mcguire Park

 O'Dwyers Gully Park

 Opossum Creek Reserve

 Opossum Creek Wildlife Corridor

 Outlook Park

Transport 

Springfield is connected to the Brisbane CBD by the Centenary Motorway and the Springfield railway line, a branch of the Ipswich railway line that starts at Darra station, and extends to Springfield.

See also 

 South East Queensland Regional Plan

References

Further reading

External links 

 

Suburbs of Ipswich, Queensland
Planned cities in Australia